Nataliya Kuznetsova, also spelt Natalia (née Trukhina; born July 1, 1991), is a Russian professional female bodybuilder and powerlifter.

Biography
Kuznetsova began powerlifting at fourteen years of age in an attempt to gain muscle mass. She graduated from Moscow State Academy of Physical Culture in 2013.

Trukhina is sponsored by the sports nutrition brands Oxytropin and RPS Nutrition. In 2019, she signed a contract with RichPiana 5% Nutrition.

She has admitted to regularly using steroids and estrogen blockers, as without such substances she would be incapable of building and maintaining the strength and muscle mass she currently possesses.

Trukhina is married to bodybuilder Vladislav Kuznetsov.

Records
 2007, 2008 Baykal Gran Prix bodybuilding champion
 2014 Champion and record holding armlifting and powerlifting at the Cup of Eurasia in Vologda, Russia
 2014 World champion and record armlifting in Crimea
 2014 World champion and record in the bench press NAP
 2014 Champion armlifting cup at the im.Poddubnogo of Russia
 European champion in bench press and deadlift (WPC), champion of Eurasia in bench press, deadlift (GPA), and armlifting
 2015 Champion of the Cup Eastern Europe (GPA), world record in the deadlift, and champion of the Cup Eastern Europe (WAA) for traction and rolling axel
 Baikal Grand Prix - 1st
 2018 IFBB WOS Romania Muscle Fest Amateur - 1st
 2019 IFBB Romania Muscle Fest Pro Women's Bodybuilding - 2nd

Measurements
 Biceps - 
 Chest - 
 Height - 
 Hips - 
 Legs - 
 Thigh - 
 Waist - 
 Weight -

Capabilities
 Bench press - 
 Squats - 
 Deadlift -

External links

 Nataliya instagram
 Nataliya Kuznetsova Fanswise

References

1991 births
Living people
Bisexual women
Professional bodybuilders
Russian female bodybuilders
Russian female weightlifters
Sportspeople from Moscow
Bisexual sportspeople
Russian LGBT sportspeople
LGBT bodybuilders
LGBT weightlifters